Leicester South East was a borough constituency in the city of Leicester. It returned one Member of Parliament (MP)  to the House of Commons of the Parliament of the United Kingdom.

The constituency was created for the 1950 general election, and abolished for the February 1974 general election.

Boundaries 
1950–1955: The County Borough of Leicester wards of Evington, Knighton, Spinney Hill, and Wycliffe.

1955–1974: As above plus the Urban District of Oadby.

Members of Parliament

Election results

Elections in the 1950s

Elections in the 1960s

Elections in the 1970s

References 

Politics of Leicester
Parliamentary constituencies in Leicestershire (historic)
Constituencies of the Parliament of the United Kingdom established in 1950
Constituencies of the Parliament of the United Kingdom disestablished in 1974